Ashraf Zindani High School, Somaj is a secondary school which is located at a village, Somaj at Chatmohar Upazila in Pabna District.

Location
The school is located at the village of Somaj of Nimaichara union at Chatmohar Upazila in the district of Pabna in the division of Rajshahi.

History
Ashraf Zindani High School, Somaj is an academic educational institute which is located at the village of Somaj of Chatmohar Upazilla in the district of Pabna in Rajshahi division. The "Educational Institute Identification Number" [EIIN number] 
of the school is 125374. It was established on 1 January 1972 by Professor Mozammel Haque Shomaji sir, who was the first elected member of parliament of independent Bangladesh from Pabna . Shomaji sir named the school after Hazrar Ashraf Zindani (Rh), who was a great pious man and an evangelist, who has buried in front of Shomaj Shahi Masjid.

Many have contributed to the establishment of Ashraf Zindani High School, Mr. F.A Khalekuzzaman is one  of them. As a result of his tiredless efforts, the school is converted into Secondary School.

Its co-education type is combined. The institute has following two discipliness: Science & Humanities. Average exam passing rate of the school is:
JSC/Equivalent: 88.24%
SSC/Equivalent: 84.47%

Its MPO number is 8103021303. It has Day shift only. The school governing council is controlled by managing committee. The school was named after Shah Ashraf Zindani. The school is situated in front of the east side of Shomaj Bazzar.

JSC Results of the last few years

SSC Results of the last few years
Here is the overall results of Ashraf Zindani High School in SSC examination of past 9 years.

Gallery

See also

 List of schools in Bangladesh

References

facsbook page of Ashraf Zindani High School, Somaj Official facsbook page of Ashraf Zindani High School, Somaj
Md. Nazmul Haque, Ex. Student (Batch-2013), Department of Mathematics, Comilla University.
Ashraf Zindani High School at Sohopati.com 
Ashraf Zindani High School, Somaj at SchoolandCollege.Com
Ashraf Zindani High School, Somaj at National Information centre of Nimaichara Union

External links

 Official Website
 Official Facebook Page

High schools in Bangladesh